The Haoling Formation is a Mesozoic geologic formation in the Ruyang Basin of Henan, Province, central China. Dinosaur remains are among the fossils that have been recovered from the formation.

The Haoling Formation was originally treated as part of the Mangchuan Formation and considered to be of Paleocene age before being recognized as Mesozoic in age. A 2012 paper divided the Mangchuan into the Xiahedong, Haoling, and Shangdonggou Formations, assigning the dinosaur-bearing horizon to the Haoling Formation and constraining the age of the Haoling as Aptian-Albian based on fieldwork and invertebrate and microfossil assemblages.

Paleofauna
 Luoyanggia liudianensis
 Xianshanosaurus shijiagouensis
 Yunmenglong ruyangensis
 Zhongyuanosaurus luoyangensis
 Ruyangosaurus giganteus
 Huanghetitan ruyangensis
Ornithomimidae spp.
Iguanodontia indet.
Carcharodontosauridae indet.

See also

 List of dinosaur-bearing rock formations
 List of stratigraphic units with few dinosaur genera

References

Aptian Stage
Albian Stage

Lower Cretaceous Series of Asia